Edward Nourse may refer to:

 Edward Everett Nourse (1863–1929), American Congregational theologian
 Edward Nourse (surgeon) (1701–1738), surgeon and member of the Royal Society